This is a list of banks in Brunei.

Central Bank

Brunei Darussalam Central Bank (BDCB)

Local Banks

Bank Islam Brunei Darussalam (BIBD)
Baiduri Bank

Foreign Banks
 Maybank (Malaysia)
 RHB Bank (Malaysia)
 Standard Chartered Bank (United Kingdom)
 United Overseas Bank (Singapore)
 Bank of China (China)

Trust Fund 

 Perbadanan Tabung Amanah Islam Brunei (TAIB)

Finance Companies

Baiduri Finance (Local)
BIBD At-Tamwil (Local)

Defunct banks in Brunei
The Islamic Development Bank of Brunei (Local)
The Islamic Bank of Brunei (Local)
Citibank (Foreign)
HSBC (Foreign)

References

Brunei
Banks
Banks

Brunei